Rafael Amen-Zadeh - physical and mathematical sciences, professor, the "Honored Teacher" of Azerbaijan (2009).

His life 

Rafael Amen-Zadeh, the son of Joseph, was born in Baku on December 31, 1943. In 1950-1960 he studied at the secondary school number of 49 in Baku. In 1960-1966, he studied at the Mechanics and Mathematics Faculty of Mechanical of BSU. To the development of education and science of the Presidential Decree of 30 October 2009, the "Honored Teacher" was named. He is married and has three children.

Education, Academic degrees and scientific titles 
1960-1966, student of Mechanics and Mathematics Faculty of Baku State University.
1966-1969, MVLomonosov Moscow State University, "the theory of plasticity" department Acad.Under the head of YN Rabotnov, he was graduate student.
1970, "Solving the problems of sass of the thin stickness construction elements by the method of variation."
1980,"Spread of waves on the cover filled with liquid"

Labor activity 
1982 - h / h, head of the Department, The department of theoretical mechanics and continuum mechanics, Mechanics and Mathematics Faculty, BSU.
1972-1982, senior lecturer, Theory of functions and functional analysis department, Mechanics and Mathematics Faculty, BSU
1969-1972, assistant, Department of Theoretical Mechanics, Mechanics and Mathematics Faculty, BSU.
His lessons: Continuum mechanics, mechanics of multiphase systems.
He is the author of two books and 150 scientific articles.

Research area 
Deformable solids mechanics, hydromechanics.

Participation on international seminars, symposiums and conferences 
1999 in Nizhny Novgorod, Russia: "The theory of shells and plates" XIX International conference.
2002 in Nizhny Novgorod, Russia: "The theory of shells and plates" XX International conference.
2006 Riga, Latvia: "Mechanics of composite materials" XIV International Conference.
2008, Riga, Latvia: "Mechanics of composite materials" XV International conference.
2008, Kazan, Russia: "The modern problems of nonlinear mechanics of coatings" International scientific seminar.
2008, Moscow, Russia: "The strength of non-structural materials,"  IV  Eurasian scientific and practical conference.
1995 Riga, Latvia: "Mechanics of composite materials" IX international conference.

His books 
Mechanics Laboratory Practice (manual) .- 1973
The whole atmosphere of the basic concepts of mechanics and equations-1987

References 

Rafael Əmənzadə
http://mechmath.bsu.edu.az/az/content/rafael_mnzad_368
http://www.imm.az/exp/dissertasiya-surasinin-t%C9%99rkibi/

1943 births
Living people
Baku State University alumni
Moscow State University alumni
Soviet physicists
Azerbaijani physicists
Scientists from Baku